This is a list of cameras, printers and paper for use with the Zink full-color printing technology.

Zink Paper printers

Zink Paper printers print photographs onto mostly 2×3" (about 5×8 cm) sheets of Zink Paper, though some print onto 3×4" (about 8×10 cm) paper, and some print onto 2.3×3.4" (5.8×8.6 cm) paper.
 Dell Wasabi (PZ310)
 Canon IVY (U.S.A.) or Zoemini (Europe) – produces 2×3" prints
 HP Sprocket
 HP Sprocket Plus - produces 2.3×3.4" (5.8×8.6 cm) prints
 HP Sprocket 200
 LG Pocket Photo (PD233)
 LG Pocket Photo 2 (PD239)
 LG Pocket Photo 3 (PD251)
 Lifeprint
 Polaroid Grey Label GL10 (PLDGL10PRINTR) – produces 3×4" prints. Discontinued.
 Polaroid PoGo
 CZA-10011B
 CZU-10011B
 CZA-20011B
 Polaroid Zip Instant Photoprinter (POLMP01)
 Prynt Case (later called Prynt Classic)
 Prynt Pocket
 Brother VC-500W
 Huawei Pocket Photo Printer
 Mi Portable Photo Printer

Combined digital cameras and Zink printers

 HP Sprocket Two-in-one / 2-in-1  –  The combined camera-printer version of the Sprocket.
 Kodak Printomatic  –  Instant Print 10 MP Digital Camera that produces 2×3" sticky-backed prints
 Kodak Smile  –  Instant Print 10 MP Digital Camera with LCD viewfinder that produces 2×3" sticky-backed prints
 Kodak Smile Classic  –  Instant Print Digital Camera that produces 3.25×4.5" sticky-backed prints
 Polaroid PoGo (CZA-05300) – a 5 MP digital camera that produces 2×3" prints
 Polaroid PIC-1000 – a 12 MP digital camera that produces 3×4" prints
 Polaroid Z340 – a 14 MP digital camera that produces 3×4" prints
 Polaroid Z2300 Digital Instant Print Camera (POLZ2300) – a 10 MP digital camera that produces 2×3" prints
 Tomy Xiao (TIP-521) – a 5 MP digital camera that produces 2×3" prints
 Polaroid Socialmatic – a 14 MP digital camera with 4.5" LCD screen, produces 2×3" prints 
 Polaroid Snap Instant Digital Camera (POLSP01) – a 10 MP digital camera that produces 2×3" prints
 Polaroid Snap Plus – a 13 MP digital camera with 3.5" LCD screen, produces 2×3" prints.
 Polaroid Pop (announced at CES 2017) – 3.5×4.25" format

Zink zRoll printers
Stylised as ZINK hAppy. Marketed as a "smart app printer". Launched in 2013.
 Zink Happy from Zink Imaging
 Zink Happy+ from Zink Imaging

Paper formats
 Zink Paper
 Zink Photo Paper (POLZPPxxx)† – 2×3" (about 5×7.6 cm) sheets
 Zink Photo Paper (POLZ3X4xx) – 3×4" (about 8×10 cm) sheets
 Premium Zink Photo Paper (POLZ2X3xx) – 2×3" sheets
 Premium Zink Rainbow Photo Paper (POLZ2X3xxRB) – 2×3" sheets
 HP Sprocket Photo Paper – 2×3" (5×7.6 cm) sheets
 HP Sprocket Plus Photo Paper – 2.3×3.4" (5.8×8.7 cm) sheets
 Zink zRoll - available in a variety of widths
† The 'x' in the model represents the number of sheets of paper in the pack.

Notes

References

External links
 Zink Holdings LLC

Computer printers
Instant photography
Polaroid cameras
Printing materials
Coated paper
Photography equipment